Galfridus de Wolvehope (fl. 1304–1313) was an English Member of Parliament.

He was a Member (MP) of the Parliament of England for Lewes in 
1304/5 and July 1313.

References

13th-century births
14th-century deaths
English MPs 1305
People from Lewes
English MPs 1313